Wila Qullu (Aymara wila blood, blood-red, qullu mountain, "red mountain") is a mountain in the Chilla-Kimsa Chata mountain range in the Andes of Bolivia which reaches a height of approximately . It is located in the La Paz Department, Ingavi Province, on the border of the municipalities of Jesús de Machaca and Tiwanaku. Wila Qullu lies north of Chuqi Q'awa.

References 

Mountains of La Paz Department (Bolivia)